Gladiopappus is a genus of flowering plants in the daisy family.

Species
There is only one known species, Gladiopappus vernonioides, endemic to Madagascar.

References

Mutisieae
Endemic flora of Madagascar
Monotypic Asteraceae genera